Ngaire Fuata is a New Zealand Television producer for TVNZ and a former Pop singer. She is of Rotuman and Dutch descent.

Personal life
Born in England, Fuata later migrated to New Zealand with her parents at a young age. She grew up in Whakatane. She has been working in the television industry for more than 20 years. In 2011, Fuata and her daughter visited her father's native island of Rotuma and filmed a documentary called Salat se Rotuma - Passage to Rotuma for TVNZ's Tagata Pasifika programme.

Music career
Fuata released her debut album self-titled Ngaire in 1991. She is best known for her remake of Lulu's To Sir with Love. It spent 5 weeks at number one on the New Zealand charts in 1990.

Filmography

Short films

Discography

Album
1991: Ngaire

Single
To Sir with Love
Son of a Preacher Man

References

External links

Living people
New Zealand television producers
Women television producers
New Zealand people of Rotuman descent
New Zealand people of Dutch descent
People from Whakatāne
English people of Rotuman descent
English people of Dutch descent
English emigrants to New Zealand
New Zealand women pop singers
Place of birth missing (living people)
Year of birth missing (living people)